Phyllonorycter hesperiella is a moth of the family Gracillariidae. It is known from the Iberian Peninsula and is probably also found in northern Africa.

Adults have been recorded on wing from March to June. There are two or more generations per year.

The larvae feed on Retama monosperma, Quercus coccifera and Quercus robur. They mine the leaves of their host plant. They create a blotch mine on the underside of the leaf.

References

hesperiella
Moths of Europe
Moths of Africa
Moths described in 1859